Royal Consort Injeol of the Incheon Yi clan (Hangul: 인절현비 이씨, Hanja: 仁節賢妃 李氏; ; d. 25 August 1082) or during her lifetime was called as Princess Sunggyeong was the 4th wife of King Munjong of Goryeo.

She was born into the Incheon Yi clan as the youngest child and daughter of Yi Ja-yeon (이자연) and Lady Gim (부인 김씨), daughter of Gim In-wi (김인위) from the Gyeongju Gim clan. Her two elder sisters both became Munjong of Goryeo's second and third wife. Although the date when she entered the palace is unknown, but she was honoured with the Royal title of Princess Sunggyeong. Meanwhile, she later died in 1082 (36th year reign of King Munjong) and received her Posthumous name of Worthy Consort Injeol (인절현비, 仁節賢妃).

References

External links
Royal Consort Injeol on Encykorea .
인절현비 on Doosan Encyclopedia .

Royal consorts of the Goryeo Dynasty
1082 deaths
Incheon Lee clan
11th-century Korean people
11th-century Korean women
Year of birth unknown